Shek Yam East Estate is a public housing estate in North Kwai Chung, New Territories, Hong Kong. It has three blocks built in 1996. It was developed on the former site of Tai Pak Tin Temporary Housing Area, and not as a redevelopment of Shek Yam Estate. It is therefore considered as an independent estate.

Houses

Demographics
According to the 2016 by-census, Shek Yam East Estate had a population of 6,647. The median age was 47.2 and the majority of residents (95.9 per cent) were of Chinese ethnicity. The average household size was 2.9 people. The median monthly household income of all households (i.e. including both economically active and inactive households) was HK$23,000.

Politics
Shek Yam East Estate is located in Shek Yam constituency of the Kwai Tsing District Council. It was formerly represented by Andrew Wan Siu-kin, who was elected in the 2019 elections until May 2021.

See also

Public housing estates in Kwai Chung

References

Residential buildings completed in 1996
Kwai Chung
Public housing estates in Hong Kong